Kannada films of 1990
Kannada films of 1991
Kannada films of 1992
Kannada films of 1993
Kannada films of 1994
Kannada films of 1995
Kannada films of 1996
Kannada films of 1997
Kannada films of 1998
Kannada films of 1999

1990s
Kannada-language
Films, Kannada